Erythropalum is a monotypic genus containing the species Erythropalum scandens and currently placed in  Erythropalaceae section of the family Olacaceae. Its native range is India and S. China and Indo-China to Malesia, with no subspecies listed in the Catalogue of Life.  Its name in Vietnamese is dây hương or bò khai.

In Vietnam, E. scandens leaves may be used as a vegetable in some soups and stir fry dishes.

Gallery

References

External links 

Flora of Indo-China
Flora of Malesia
Olacaceae
Monotypic Santalales genera